was a senior retainer of the Asakura clan throughout the mid-Sengoku Period of Feudal Japan.

Samurai
1570 deaths
Year of birth unknown